During the 1990–91 English football season, Queens Park Rangers competed in the First Division for the eighth year running.

Season summary
QPR made a poor start to the season for the third year in a row, losing eight consecutive matches between October and December 1990. They recovered in the new year to finish twelfth in the First Division, with the highlight being a 3–1 win at Anfield against title-chasing Liverpool. They were knocked out of the FA Cup in the third round by Manchester United for the second time in three seasons. Roy Wegerle scored eighteen League goals, including an outstanding solo effort against Leeds United at Elland Road in October 1990.

Final league table

Results
Queens Park Rangers' score comes first

Football League First Division

FA Cup

League Cup

Full Members' Cup

Squad
Squad at end of season

Left club during season

References

Queens Park Rangers F.C. seasons
Queens Park Rangers
Queens Park Rangers F.C.